Machher Jhol, Machha Jhola or Machhak Jhora is a traditional spicy fish curry in Bengali and Odia cuisines in the eastern part of the Indian subcontinent. It is in the form of a very spicy stew or gravy that is served with rice. Machher Jhol is liberally seasoned with turmeric, garlic, onions, and grated ginger and Indian spices. Potatoes are added to the curry as a thickening agent. Tomatoes are also added to impart the dish with a reddish color which is preferred by the people of Bengal.

The kinds of fish that typically used in Odia and Bengali households are ilish or ilishi, rui , and catla. Apart from these, there are some famous small sized fish that are normally favoured over others.

Ingredients

Fish, potatoes, onions, ginger, garlic, turmeric, tomatoes, chilli peppers, other seasonings.

See also
 Bengali cuisine
 Dahi machha
 Chingudi jhola
 Chhencheda
 Odia cuisine
 Maithil cuisine

References

Bengali curries
Bangladeshi fish dishes
Indian curries
Indian fish dishes
Odia cuisine
National dishes
Bihari cuisine